In enzymology, a lignostilbene alphabeta-dioxygenase is an enzyme that catalyzes the chemical reaction

1,2-bis(4-hydroxy-3-methoxyphenyl)ethylene + O2  2 vanillin

Thus, the two substrates of this enzyme are 1,2-bis(4-hydroxy-3-methoxyphenyl)ethylene and O2, whereas its product is vanillin.

This enzyme belongs to the family of oxidoreductases, specifically those acting on single donors with O2 as oxidant and incorporation of two atoms of oxygen into the substrate (oxygenases). The oxygen incorporated need not be derived from O2.  The systematic name of this enzyme class is 1,2-bis(4-hydroxy-3-methoxyphenyl)ethylene:oxygen oxidoreductase (alphabeta-bond-cleaving). It employs one cofactor, iron.

References

 

EC 1.13.11
Iron enzymes
Enzymes of unknown structure